Longest bridge may refer to:

 List of longest bridges
 List of longest suspension bridge spans
 List of longest cable-stayed bridge spans
 List of longest cantilever bridge spans
 List of longest arch bridge spans
 List of longest continuous truss bridge spans
 List of longest masonry arch bridge spans
 Timeline of three longest supported deck arch bridge spans

See also
 List of longest tunnels